Alexy van Kimmenade (born: Van de Kimmenade) (born 15 December 1981 in Merksem, Belgium) was the star of reality TV programme Dirty Cows, presented by Tara Palmer-Tomkinson.

His parents are (Dutchman) Wim van Kimmenade and (Belgian) Pinky Countess le Grelle (daughter of count Pierre-Amaury le Grelle), who divorced in 1986. This was Pinky le Grelle's second marriage; she was previously married to Dominique Baron de Meester de Ravestein. Le Grelle later married jonkheer Michel van Hoorebeke.

In 2018, Alexy was convicted of speeding and perverting the course of justice after making a false statement that his father had been driving during the speeding offence. He was sentenced at Truro Crown Court with a suspended sentence of two years, as well as 300 hours'community service, a £150 fine and £250 in costs, while three points were added to his driving licence.

Alexy grew up in Belgium, the Netherlands, Austria and on his mother's estate in Cornwall, and was educated at different schools in Belgium and England. He speaks several languages. He also has an older brother named Roderick.

References

 Farmer wants wife, Alquin Magazine, 2007-II, p. 4-6, Frances Hubbard

1981 births
Living people
Reality show winners
People from Merksem